Dairy Management Inc. is an American trade association funded primarily by the U.S. Dairy Promotion Program, itself funded by government-mandated checkoff fees on dairy products and federal tax dollars and dedicated to promoting the sale of American-made dairy products. It also operates under the names Innovation Center for U.S. Dairy, American Dairy Association, National Dairy Council and U.S. Dairy Export Council.

Dairy Management Inc. was incorporated in 1995 as a nonprofit corporation by members of the National Dairy Promotion and Research Board and the United Dairy Industry Association.  It is a marketing creation of the U.S. Department of Agriculture and is funded by Dairy Promotion Program government-mandated fees on dairy products and by general federal tax dollars via the U.S. Department of Agriculture. The corporation has 162 employees and a budget of about $140 million It is headed by CEO Barbara O'Brian after long time leader Tom Gallagher retired from the post in 2021

Dairy Management is associated with the "Got Milk?" and "Real Seal" campaigns and works with industry to develop products that increase consumption of milk and cheese. It also funds research into the benefits of dairy consumption. Dairy Management has successfully promoted increased use of cheese in prepared food products such as pizza. This initiative has been criticized by Dr. Walter C. Willett, chairman of the nutrition department at the Harvard School of Public Health and a former member of the federal government's nutrition advisory committee, as being contradictory to the nutrition goal of reducing consumption of saturated fat also promoted by the United States Department of Agriculture.

See also
 California Milk Processor Board

References

External links
Dairy Management Inc. Official website

Commodity checkoff programs
American dairy organizations
Organizations based in Illinois
Organizations established in 1995
1995 establishments in the United States